Koh Eng Tian  is a former Solicitor-General of Singapore. He was appointed to the post in 1981 until his retirement in December 1991. He was born in 1937 and was educated in Victoria School and the University of Malaya in Singapore. He was one of the first two Senior Counsel appointed in Singapore in 1989.

References

Singaporean people of Chinese descent
20th-century Singaporean lawyers
Solicitors-General of Singapore
Singaporean Senior Counsel
National University of Singapore alumni
Victoria School, Singapore alumni
Living people
Year of birth missing (living people)